Edgar Naujok (born 25 June 1960) is a German politician for the right-wing AfD and since 2021 member of the Bundestag, the federal diet.

Life and politics 

Naujock was born 1960 in the West German city of Ludwigshafen and was elected directly to the Bundestag in 2021.

References 

Living people
1960 births
Alternative for Germany politicians
Members of the Bundestag 2021–2025
21st-century German politicians
People from Ludwigshafen